John Gillis or Gillies may refer to:
 John Gillies (minister) (1712–1796), Church of Scotland minister and theological writer
 John Gillies (historian) (1747–1836), Scottish historian
 John Gillies (botanist) (1792–1834), Scottish naval surgeon, explorer and botanist
 John P. Gillis (1803–1873), U.S. Navy officer
 John Gillies (New Zealand politician) (1802–1871), New Zealand local politician (Otago Provincial Council) and church elder
 John Lillie Gillies (1832–1897), New Zealand politician
 John Gillies (Canadian politician) (1837–1889), Ontario farmer and political figure
 John Gillies (Australian politician) (1844–1911), Scottish-born Australian politician
 John F. Gillis (1846–1899), physician and political figure in Prince Edward Island
 John Joseph Alban Gillis (1882–1965), physician and politician in British Columbia, Canada
 John Hugh Gillis (1884–1913), Canadian track and field athlete
 John Gillies (footballer) (1918–1991), Scottish footballer
 John Gillies (doctor) (fl. 1970s–2010s), Scottish general practitioner
 John Gillis (historian) (born 1939), professor of history at Rutgers University
 John Gillies (artist and musician) (born 1960), Australian artist and musician
 Jack White or John Gillis (born 1975), musician
 Jon Gillies (born 1994), ice hockey player
 John Gillis, vice-president, Nova Scotia Liberal Party, endorser of Scott Brison in the 2006 Liberal Party of Canada leadership convention